The communauté de communes des Portes du Boischaut was created on December 14, 1999 and is located in the Cher  département  of the Centre  region of France. It was created in January 2000. It was merged into the new Communauté de communes Arnon Boischaut Cher in 2011.

The Communauté de communes comprised the following communes:
Chambon
Chavannes
Crézançay-sur-Cher
Saint-Loup-des-Chaumes
Serruelles
Uzay-le-Venon
Vallenay

References 

Portes du Boischaut